TRAZ (meaning Transformable Arcade Zone) is a 1988 Arkanoid clone released by Cascade Games for the Commodore 64, DOS, and ZX Spectrum. TRAZ includes a level editor.

External links 

TRAZ at World of Spectrum

Commodore 64 games
1988 video games
Breakout clones
DOS games
ZX Spectrum games
Video games developed in the United Kingdom